The Palnadu Express is a prestigious train between Guntur And Hyderabad City Superfast express train in India which runs between Guntur in Andhra Pradesh and Vikarabad in Telangana. It was introduced on 16 August 1998. This train is named after the Palnadu region in Guntur district of Andhra Pradesh. It is the first train in the division to be equipped with foldable wheelchair and ramp for the differently-abled passengers.

Rake sharing 
This train shares its rake with Simhadri Express.

Route and halts 
This train stops at Sattenapalli, Piduguralla, Nadikude Jn, Vishnupuram, Miryalaguda, Nalgonda, Chityala, Nagireddipalli, Secunderabad Jn, Begumpet, Sanathnagar, Lingampalli, Shankarpalli.

Coach Composition 
The 21 coach composition contains– 1 AC Chair Car, 4 Chair car Sitting, 14 General,2 SLR 
It runs with ICF coaches (Green indicating Electric locomotive, Yellow indicating colour of the general coaches, pink indicating reserved coaches and blue indicating AC coaches) 
Coach Composition from Guntur to Vikarabad as 12747

Coach Composition from Vikarabad to Guntur as 12748

Amenities 
In January 2020, it became the first disabled friendly train in India. It is equipped with foldable ramps, that allow pushing of the wheelchairs into the coaches and wheelchairs themselves help passengers with disability to navigate through the coach aisle.

See also 

 Express trains in India

References 

Transport in Guntur
Railway services introduced in 1998
Named passenger trains of India
Rail transport in Andhra Pradesh
Rail transport in Telangana
Express trains in India